Pembroke Wanderers Hockey Club (Club Haca Pheambróg in Irish) is a field hockey club based in the Sandymount/Ballsbridge area of Dublin 4, Ireland. The club was founded in 1922 and named after the Pembroke Township. The club's senior men's team plays in the Men's Irish Hockey League and the Men's Irish Senior Cup. The club's senior women's team plays in the Women's Irish Hockey League and the Women's Irish Senior Cup. Reserve teams play in the Irish Junior Cup and the Women's Irish Junior Cup. Pembroke has also represented Ireland in European competitions. They won the 2009 EuroHockey Club Trophy.

History

Men's Irish Senior Cup
Pembroke Wanderers won the Men's Irish Senior Cup for the first time in 1933.

Notes

Men's Irish Hockey League

Notes

Men's Irish Junior Cup

Notes

Women's Irish Senior Cup
Pembroke Wanderers won the Women's Irish Senior Cup for the first time in 1931.

Notes

Women's Irish Junior Cup

Pembroke in Europe

Men

Women

Notable players

Men's internationals

 
 Paddy Conlon  

 Harry Cahill: 1960, 1964, 1968 

 Craig Fulton
 Ian Symons

Women's internationals
 
When Ireland won the silver medal at the 2018 Women's Hockey World Cup, the squad included two Pembroke Wanderers players, Gillian Pinder and Emily Beatty.

 Natalie Fulton

Honours

Men
EuroHockey Club Trophy
Winners: 2009: 1 
EuroHockey Club Champions Trophy
Winners: 2007: 1  
Men's Irish Hockey League
Winners: 2008–09, 2009–10: 2
All-Ireland Club Championship
Winners: 1995, 2001, 2006, 2007: 4
Men's Irish Senior Cup
Winners: 1933, 1937, 1973, 2000, 2008, 2009: 6
Runners Up: 1952, 1966, 1967, 1997, 2002, 2013, 2014, 2018 : 8
Irish Junior Cup
Winners: 1926, 1938, 1942, 1961, 1996, 2001, 2007, 2008: 8
Runners Up: 1948, 1949, 1970, 1994, 2002, 2009, 2018: 7
Leinster Senior League
Winners: 1935, 1936, 1942, 1947, 1951, 1964, 1965, 1994, 1995, 1997, 1998, 1999, 2001,  2004, 2005, 2009, 2013: 17
Leinster Senior Cup
Winners: 1938, 1941, 1944, 1945, 1946, 1947, 1949, 1950, 1973, 1975, 1976, 1977, 1998,  1999, 2000, 2001, 2003, 2006, 2010: 19
Railway Cup
Winners: 1940, 1941, 1942, 1959, 1970, 1974, 1979, 1980, 1981, 1985, 1988, 2001, 2004,  2007, 2008: 15
Leinster Indoor Cup
Winners: 1986, 2007: 2

Women
European Cup Winners Cup
Runners Up: 2008: 1
Women's Irish Senior Cup
Winners: 1931, 1937, 1947, 1948, 1949, 1950, 1952, 1965, 1967, 1970, 1973, 1975: 12
Runners Up: 1988, 2007, 2013–14: 3
Women's Irish Junior Cup
Winners: 1956, 1959, 1961, 1962, 1986, 1987, 1994, 1998, 2013, 2015: 10
Runners Up: 2012, 2014, 2017: 3
Irish Junior League
Winners: 1998
Leinster Senior League
Winners: 1931, 1936, 1939, 1940, 1942, 1949, 1952, 1958, 1963, 1966, 1969, 1970, 1971,  1972, 1973, 1974, 1975: 17
Leinster Senior Cup
Winners: 1931, 1944, 1949, 1967, 1970, 1973, 1984, 2003: 8

References

 
Field hockey clubs in County Dublin
1922 establishments in Ireland
Sports clubs in Dublin (city)
Field hockey clubs established in 1922
Men's Irish Hockey League teams
Women's Irish Hockey League teams